Volontaire Civil à lAide Technique (VCAT) is a voluntary service in the French overseas territories for citizens from France, citizens of other EU member states or citizens of countries belonging to the European Economic Area.

External links
VCAT

Mutual organizations